Justice Deepak Verma is an Indian jurist and a former Judge of the Supreme Court of India. He has been the Chief Justice of Rajasthan High Court, Acting Chief Justice of High Court of Karnataka and Judge of the High Court of Madhya Pradesh.

References

Indian jurists
Justices of the Supreme Court of India
Living people
1947 births